Pseudoperipatus is a monospecific genus of annulated ecdysozoan worm known only from its posterior portion, from a single Burgess Shale specimen.  Its rear termination ends in a pair of claw-like structures on 'appendages'.

References 

Prehistoric protostome genera
Protostome enigmatic taxa
Burgess Shale fossils
Fossil taxa described in 2014